Starbase is a spaceport, production, and development facility for Starship rockets, located at Boca Chica, Texas, United States. It is in construction in the late 2010s and 2020s by SpaceX, an American aerospace manufacturer.

When conceptualized, its stated purpose was "to provide SpaceX an exclusive launch site that would allow the company to accommodate its launch manifest and meet tight launch windows." The launch site was originally intended to support launches of the Falcon 9 and Falcon Heavy launch vehicles as well as "a variety of reusable suborbital launch vehicles", but in early 2018, SpaceX announced a change of plans, stating that the launch site would be used exclusively for SpaceX's next-generation launch vehicle, Starship. Between 2018 and 2020, the site added significant rocket production and test capacity.  SpaceX CEO Elon Musk indicated in 2014 that he expected "commercial astronauts, private astronauts, to be departing from South Texas," and he foresaw launching spacecraft to Mars from the site.

Between 2012 and 2014, SpaceX considered seven potential locations around the United States for the new commercial launch facility. Generally, for orbital launches an ideal site would have an easterly water overflight path for safety and be located as close to the equator as possible in order to take advantage of the Earth's rotational speed. For much of this period, a parcel of land adjacent to Boca Chica Beach near Brownsville, Texas, was the leading candidate location, during an extended period while the US Federal Aviation Administration (FAA) conducted an extensive environmental assessment on the use of the Texas location as a launch site. SpaceX announced in August 2014, that they had selected the location near Brownsville as the location for the new non-governmental launch site, after the final environmental assessment completed and environmental agreements were in place by July 2014. An orbital launch of the Starship would make it SpaceX's fourth active launch facility, following three launch locations that are leased from the US government.

SpaceX conducted a groundbreaking ceremony on the new launch facility in September 2014, and soil preparation began in October 2015. The first tracking antenna was installed in August 2016, and the first propellant tank arrived in July 2018. In late 2018, construction ramped up considerably, and the site saw the fabrication of the first  prototype test vehicle, Starhopper, which was tested and flown March–August 2019.  Through 2021, additional prototype flight vehicles are being built at the facility for higher-altitude tests.  By March 2020, there were over 500 people employed at the facility, with most of the work force involved in 24/7 production operations for the third-generation SpaceX launch vehicle, Starship.

History
Private discussions between SpaceX and various state officials about a future private launch site began at least as early as 2011, and SpaceX CEO Elon Musk mentioned interest in a private launch site for their commercial launches in a speech in September 2011. The company publicly announced in August 2014 that they had decided on Texas as the location for their new non-governmental launch site, the SpaceX South Texas launch site. Site soil work began in 2015 and major construction of facilities began in late-2018, with rocket engine testing and flight testing beginning in 2019.

The name Starbase began to be used more widely by SpaceX after March 2021 when SpaceX had some discussions described as a "casual enquiry" about incorporating a city to be called Starbase, and by early 2022, the Starbase moniker for the SpaceX facilities in south Texas had become common. Starbase is also used sometimes to describe the region of the Boca Chica subdelta peninsula surrounding the SpaceX facilities; see .

Launch site selection and environmental assessment 
As early as April 2007, at least five potential locations were publicly known, including "sites in Alaska, California, Florida, Texas and Virginia." In September 2012, it became clear that Georgia and Puerto Rico were also interested in pursuing the new SpaceX commercial spaceport facility. The Camden County, Georgia, Joint Development Authority voted unanimously in November 2012 to "explore developing an aero-spaceport facility" at an Atlantic coastal site to support both horizontal and vertical launch operations. The main Puerto Rico site under consideration at the time was land that had formerly been the Roosevelt Roads Naval Station. By September 2012, SpaceX was considering seven potential locations for the new commercial launch pad around the United States.  For much of the time since, the leading candidate location for the new facility was a parcel of land adjacent to Boca Chica Beach near Brownsville, Texas.

By early 2013, Texas remained the leading candidate for the location of the new SpaceX commercial launch facility, although Florida, Georgia and other locations also remained in the running.

From the beginning, one of the proposed locations for the new commercial-mission-only spaceport had been south Texas. In April 2012, the FAA's Office of Commercial Space Transportation initiated a Notice of Intent to conduct an Environmental Impact Statement and public hearings on the new launch site, which would be located in Cameron County, Texas. The summary then indicated that the Texas site would support up to 12 commercial launches per year, including two Falcon Heavy launches. The first public meeting was held in May 2012, and the FAA released a draft Environmental Impact Statement (EIS) for the location in south Texas in April 2013. 
Public hearings on the draft EIS occurred in Brownsville, followed by a public comment period ending in June 2013.
The draft EIS identified three parcels of land—total of —that would notionally be used for the control center. In addition, SpaceX had leased  of land adjacent to the terminus of Texas State Highway 4,  of which would be used to develop the vertical launch area; the remainder would remain open space surrounding the launch facility.
In July 2014, the FAA officially issued its Record of Decision concerning the Boca Chica Beach facility, and found that "the proposal by Elon Musk's Space Exploration Technologies would have no significant impact on the environment," approving the proposal and outlining SpaceX's proposal. The company formally announced selection of the Texas location in August 2014.

In September 2013, the State of Texas General Land Office (GLO) and Cameron County signed an agreement outlining how beach closures would be handled in order to support a future SpaceX launch schedule. The agreement is intended to enable both economic development in Cameron County and protect the public's right to have access to Texas state beaches. Under the 2013 Texas plan, beach closures would be allowed but were not expected to exceed a maximum of 15 hours per closure date, with no more than three scheduled space flights between the Saturday prior to Memorial Day and Labor Day, unless the Texas GLO approves.

In 2019, the FAA completed a reevaluation of the SpaceX facilities in South Texas, and in particular the revised plans away from a commercial spaceport to more of a spaceship yard for building and testing rockets at the facility, as well as flying different rockets—SpaceX Starship and prototype test vehicles—from the site than the Falcon 9 and Falcon Heavy envisioned in the original 2014 environmental assessment.
In May and August 2019, the FAA issued a written report with a decision that a new supplemental Environmental Impact Statement (EIS) would not be required.
In May 2021, the FAA issued a written FAQ regarding the FAA's Environmental Review of SpaceX Starship/Super Heavy Operations at the Boca Chica Launch Site. 

In 2022, Starship had been delayed extensively from an orbital flight due to a delay in an FAA (Federal Aviation Administration) license to allow findings on environmental impact. On 13 June 2022, the FAA announced that Starbase was not creating a significant impact to the environment, yet listed more than 75 actions to be taken before review of an orbital launch license. Some of these actions include $5,000 contributions to wildlife non-profits in the area, making sure roadways stay open on certain days of the year, and actions to protect local sea turtle populations.

Land acquisition 
Prior to a final decision on the location of the spaceport, SpaceX began purchasing a number of real estate properties in Cameron County, Texas, beginning in June 2012.

Prior to May 2013, five lots in the Spanish Dagger Subdivision in Boca Chica Village, adjacent to Highway 4 which leads to the proposed launch site, had been purchased. An additional few acres were purchased late in 2013, raising the SpaceX total "from 72 undeveloped lots to 80 lots totaling about 26 acres." In late 2013, SpaceX completed a replat of 13 lots totaling  into a subdivision that they have named "Mars Crossing."

SpaceX's investments in Cameron County continued in March 2014, with the purchase of more tracts of land, bringing the total number of lots it now owns to 90. This is in addition to  that SpaceX then had under lease. By September 2014, Dogleg Park completed a replat of lots totaling  into a second subdivision, this one named "Launch Site Texas", made up of several parcels of property previously purchased. This is the site of the launch site itself while the launch control facility is planned two miles west in the Mars Crossing subdivision. Dogleg Park has also continued purchasing land in Boca Chica, and now owns a total of "87 lots equaling more than 100 acres".

In September 2019, SpaceX extended an offer to buy each of the houses in Boca Chica Village for three times the fair market value along with an offer of VIP invitations to future launch events.  The 3x offer was said to be "non-negotiable."  Homeowners were given two weeks for this particular offer to remain valid.

Construction 

Major site construction at SpaceX's launch site in Boca Chica got underway in 2016, with site soil preparation for the launch pad in a process said to take two years, with significant additional soil work and significant construction beginning in late 2018.  By September 2019, the site had been "transformed into an operational launch site – outfitted with the ground support equipment needed to support test flights of the methane-fueled Starship vehicles." Lighter construction of fencing and temporary buildings in the control center area had begun in 2014.

The Texas launch location was projected in the 2013 draft EIS to include a  vertical launch area and a  area for a launch control center and a launch pad directly adjacent to the eastern terminus of Texas State Highway 4. Changes occurred based on actual land SpaceX was able to purchase and replat for the control center and primary spaceship build yard.

SpaceX broke ground on the new launch site in September 2014, but indicated then that the principal work to build the facility was not expected to ramp up until late 2015 after the SpaceX launch site development team completed work on Kennedy Space Center Launch Pad 39A, as the same team was expected to manage the work to build the Boca Chica facility. Advance preparation work was expected to commence ahead of that.
The design phase for the facility was completed by March 2015. In the event, construction was delayed by the destruction of one of SpaceX two Florida launch facilities in a September 2016 rocket explosion, which tied up the launch site design/build team for over a year.

In order to stabilize the waterlogged ground at the coastal site, SpaceX engineers determined that a process known as soil surcharging would be required. In January 2016, following additional soil testing that revealed foundation problems, SpaceX indicated they were not planning to complete construction until 2017, and the first launch from Boca Chica was not expected until late 2018. In February 2016, SpaceX President and COO Gwynne Shotwell stated that construction had been delayed by poor soil stability at the site, and that "two years of dirt work" would be required before SpaceX could build the launch facility, with construction costs expected to be higher than previously estimated. The first phase of the soil stabilization process was completed by May 2016.

Two  S-band tracking station antennas were installed at the site in 2016–2017. They were formerly used to track the Space Shuttle during launch and landing and made operational as tracking resources for crewed Dragon missions in 2018.

A SpaceX-owned  photovoltaic power station was installed on site to provide off-grid electrical power near the control center, The solar farm was installed by SolarCity in January 2018.

Progress on building the pad had slowed considerably through 2017, much slower than either SpaceX or Texas state officials had expected when it was announced in 2014. Support for SpaceX, however, remained fairly strong amongst Texas public officials. In January 2018, COO Shotwell said the pad might be used for "early vehicle testing" by late 2018 or early 2019 but that additional work would be required after that to make it into a full launch site. SpaceX achieved this new target, with prototype rocket and rocket engine ground testing at Boca Chica starting in March 2019, and suborbital flight tests starting in July 2019.

In late 2018, construction ramped up considerably, and the site saw the development of a large propellant tank farm including a 95,000 gallon horizontal liquid oxygen tank and 80,000 gallon liquid methane tank, a gas flare, more offices, and a small flat square launch pad. The Starhopper prototype was relocated to the pad in March 2019, and first flew in late July 2019.

In late 2018, the "Mars Crossing" subdivision developed into a shipyard, with the development of several large hangars, and several concrete jigs, on top of which large steel rocket airframes were fabricated, the first of which became the Starhopper test article. In February 2019, SpaceX confirmed that the first orbit-capable Starship and Super Heavy test articles would be manufactured nearby, at the "SpaceX South Texas build site." By September 2019, the facility had been completely transformed into a new phase of an industrial rocket build facility, working multiple shifts and more than five days a week, able to support large rocket ground and flight testing. As of November 2019 the SpaceX south Texas Launch Site crew has been working on a new launch pad for its Starship/Super Heavy rocket; the former launch site has been transformed to an assembly site for the Starship rocket.

On 7 March 2021, it was revealed by Michael Baylor on Twitter that the SpaceX South Texas Launch Site may eventually expand to the south. The expansion could see the addition of 2 Suborbital test stands along with one orbital launch pad code-named Orbital Launch Mount B. The expansion could also include a new landing pad, an expansion to the current tank farm, a new tank farm situated next to the proposed Orbital Launch Mount B, expanded Suborbital Pad B decking and two integration towers situated to under-construction Orbital Launch Mount A and the proposed Orbital Launch Mount B.

In March 2021, SpaceX received a "Determination of no hazard to air navigation" from the FAA for the  launch tower that SpaceX is building that is intended to support orbital launches.  The period of construction shown on the FAA documents was April–July 2021 but the expiration date on the regulatory approval was 18 September 2021.

The  launch tower was fully stacked by late July 2021, when a crane lifted the ninth and final large steel section to the top of the tower at the orbital launch site (OLS). The tower is designed to have a set of large arms attached which will be used to stack both Super Heavy and the Starship second stage on the adjacent launch mount and, eventually, catch the rocket on return to the launch site as well. There will be no separate large crane attached to the top of the tower.
The launch mount ("Stage Zero") began construction in July 2020 when the rebar of the deep foundation began to rise above the ground. Soon six large steel circular launch supports rose from the ground which would eventually support the massive weight of the launch table some ten months later. The mount got to full height on 31 July 2021 with the rollout and craning into place of the  launch table, which had been custom built at the manufacturing site over the preceding months. Musk has commented that Stage Zero is everything needed to both launch and catch the rocket, and that building it is at least as hard as the booster or ship. , launch mount and launch tower plumbing, electrical, and ground support equipment connections are yet to be completed. Soon after tests for Starships were taking a break, production started to get ready for the First Orbital Launch. They started making GSE tanks, Cyro shells, SN20, and Booster 4. As SN20 was completed, and Booster 4 and SN20 were rolled out to the launch site for a full stack. On August 6th 2021, SN20 was stacked on top of Booster 4 showing a great view of the two on the Orbital Launch Table giving us a great view of the future. SN20 soon after was taken back to the Production site, and Booster 4 as well to finish what needed to be finished between the two.

As of October 28, 2021, Starship SN20 and Booster 4 are at the launch site and are conducting proof tests for the First Orbital launch very soon. SN20 conducted two proof tests which were successful, but lost some heat tiles in the process, and recently conducted a pre burner test, and a raptor engine test firing up its engines, and lost some heat tiles again during the process which is very normal as tests are conducted to gather information for future tests. Booster 4 has not conducted any tests yet as it sits on its test stand waiting for its first proof tests or even a raptor engine test in the near future.

Operation 

The South Texas Launch Site is SpaceX's fourth active launch facility, and its first private facility. , SpaceX leased three US government-owned launch sites: Vandenberg SLC 4 in California, and Cape Canaveral SLC-40 and Kennedy Space Center LC39A both in Florida.

The launch site is planned to be optimized for commercial activity, as well as used to fly spacecraft on interplanetary trajectories.

Launches on orbital trajectories from Brownsville will have a constrained flight path, due to the Caribbean Islands as well as the large number of oil platforms in the Gulf of Mexico. SpaceX has stated that they have a good flight path available for the launching of satellites on trajectories toward the commercially valuable geosynchronous orbit.

Although SpaceX initial plans for the Boca Chica launch site were to loft robotic spacecraft to geosynchronous orbits, Elon Musk indicated in September 2014 that "the first person to go to another planet could launch from [the Boca Chica launch site]", but did not indicate which launch vehicle might be used for those launches. In May 2018, Elon Musk clarified that the South Texas launch site would be used exclusively for Starship.

By March 2019, two test articles of Starship were being built, and three by May. The low-altitude, low-velocity Starship test flight rocket was used for initial integrated testing of the Raptor rocket engine with a flight-capable propellant structure, and was slated to also test the newly designed autogenous pressurization system that is replacing traditional helium tank pressurization as well as initial launch and landing algorithms for the much larger  rocket. SpaceX originally developed their reusable booster technology for the 3-meter-diameter Falcon 9 from 2012 to 2018. The Starhopper prototype was also the platform for the first flight tests of the full-flow staged combustion methalox Raptor engine, where the hopper vehicle was flight tested with a single engine in July/August 2019, but could be fitted with up to three engines to facilitate engine-out tolerance testing. Starhopper currently stands to the side of the launchpad, hosting what appears to be radar equipment.

The launch site has been the main production and testing site of the Starship/Super Heavy system. All Starship vehicles have been constructed here besides the Mk2 prototype, which was built in Florida but never completed, and eventually scrapped.

By March 2020, SpaceX had doubled the number of employees onsite for Starship manufacturing, test and operations since January, with over 500 employees working at the site.  Four shifts are working 24/7—in 12-hour shifts with 4 days on then 3 off followed by 3 days on and 4 off—to enable continuous Starship manufacturing with workers and equipment specialized to each task of serial Starship production. A 1 MW solar farm and a 3.8 MWh battery supplies some of the electricity.

In September 2022, during a first test firing of all six engines of the Starship prototype, scattered hot debris ignited a SpaceX dumpster, and caused a bushfire in the nearby Las Palomas Wildlife Management Area, an environmentally sensitive area, ultimately destroying 68 acres before the fire could be doused.

Impact 

A local economic development board was created for south Texas in 2014—the Cameron County Space Port Development Corporation (CCSPDC)—in order to facilitate the development of the aerospace industry in Cameron County near Brownsville. The first project for the newly established board is the SpaceX project to develop a launch site at Boca Chica Beach. In May 2015, Cameron County transferred ownership of 25 lots in Boca Chica to CCSPDC, which were stated could be used in the future to develop event parking.

Effects on nearby homeowners 
The launch facility was approved to be constructed two miles from approximately thirty homes, with no indication that this would cause problems for the homeowners. Five years later in 2019, following an FAA revaluation of the environmental impact and the issuance of new FAA requirements that residents be asked to voluntarily stay outside their houses during particular tanking and engine ignition tests, SpaceX decided that a couple dozen of these homes were now too close to the launch facility over the long term and began seeking market acquisition of these properties. An attorney with expertise on such situations referred to the timeframe given by SpaceX for homeowners to consider their purchase offer as "aggressive".

The United States Fish and Wildlife Service claimed that SpaceX had caused 1,000 hours of highway closures in 2019, well above the permitted 300 hours. In June 2021, Cameron County District Attorney Luis Saenz threatened to prosecute SpaceX for unauthorized road and beach closures, as well as employing security officers who may not be licensed to carry handguns.

Environmental concerns 
Some residents of Boca Chica Village, Brownsville, and environmental activists criticized the Starship development program, stating that SpaceX had harmed local wildlife, conducted unauthorized test flights along with infrastructure construction, and polluted the area with noise. Environmental groups warned that the program threatens wildlife in the area, including 18 vulnerable and endangered species. A rare beetle species, the Boca Chica Flea Beetle (Chaetocnema rileyi), is known only from the beachside dune system next to the launchpad. The spaceport is built under the assumption that the Falcon Heavy rocket would launch there, thus creating a large radius where a Starship debris can land on.

During the SN8 launch, SpaceX ignored FAA warnings that the flight profile posed a risk of explosion. Following the launch, the FAA's Associate Administrator Wayne Monteith commented that SpaceX does not have a strong safety culture for not conducting thorough checks and following the FAA's statements. Members of the United States Congress voiced concerns about the FAA's response, calling on the agency to not have too much influence over SpaceX. However, the FAA Administrator stated that while SpaceX had done several corrections for those violations, the FAA would not approve further flights if SpaceX did not continue to perform those corrections. David Newstead, the director of one local environmental group, said that the explosion of SN11 left rocket debris on parts of the wildlife refuge that took three months to clean up.

The FAA allowed the public to comment until 1 November on the environmental impact statement draft that is released on 19 September. SpaceX's environmental assessment missed important details about the propellant source. One such example is SpaceX's plan of building a 250-megawatt gas-fired power plant without specifying how it would obtain tens of millions of cubic feet of gas per day. Pat Parenteau, a law professor and senior counsel for the Environmental Advocacy Clinic at Vermont Law School, stated that it was unusual to exclude such details, which could violate the U.S. National Environmental Policy Act.

Research facilities 
The Brownsville Economic Development Council (BEDC) was building a space tracking facility in Boca Chica Village on a  site adjacent to the SpaceX launch control center.  The STARGATE tracking facility is a joint project of the BEDC, SpaceX, and the University of Texas Rio Grande Valley (formerly the University of Texas at Brownsville at the time the agreement was reached).

Tourism 
In January 2016, the South Padre Island Convention and Visitors Advisory Board (CVA) recommended that the South Padre Island City Council "proceed with further planning regarding potential SpaceX viewing sites."

See also
 List of spaceports
 SpaceX reusable launch system development program

References

External links

 SpaceX gets preliminary FAA nod for South Texas launch site, Waco Tribune-Herald, 16 April 2013.
 Lone Star State Bets Heavily on a Space Economy, New York Times, 27 November 2014.

Spaceports in the United States
SpaceX facilities
Cameron County, Texas
2014 establishments in Texas